SIATT is a Brazilian company headquartered in São José dos Campos, São Paulo. It is a company focused on high-tech market, especially for the defense industry.

The company was founded on 2015 as Mectron through an association of engineers from other companies in the sector in São José dos Campos. Among its main products are radars, weapons, missiles, PGMs and simulators.

After the founders of Mectron moved away from the company, the company named SIATT was established based on former Mectron.

Products
Tailchute Recovery System for the Embraer E-Jet family.
MAA-1A Piranha: Missile air-air short-range infrared guidance.
 MAA-1B Piranha: The project is no longer under development, it would be a 4.5 generation missile, but according to the 2017 annual report from Brazilian Air Force (FAB), after spending R$  50.631.057,22 (CE  NOV04) the project were decommissioned.
A-Darter (missile): A project that is being developed by Brazil, and Denel Dynamics of the  South Africa.
MAN-1 (MANSUP): Developing jointly with the Avibras for the Brazilian Navy. Is anti-ship missile with a range 80–100 km.
TP-1 TPNer first Brazilian national torpedo.
MAR-1:  Anti-radiation missile.
MSS-1.2AC:  Anti-Tank Missile with laser guidance and medium-range (3 km).
Precision-guided munition In development with Britanite Defence System for Brazilian Air Force, guided by Inertial navigation system, GPS or Glonass.
SMKB-82 ACAUAN: Guided bombs. 
SMKB-83 ACAUAN: Guided bombs.
SCP-01 Scipio:  Radar that will be used in modernizing of Brazil's Fighter AMX A-1M.

References

External links
 

Companies based in São Paulo (state)
Defence companies of Brazil
Aerospace companies of Brazil
Brazilian brands
Odebrecht
Organisations based in São José dos Campos
Technology companies established in 1991
Brazilian companies established in 1991